The militsiya hour was a curfew law passed during martial law in Poland on  1981 during which the militsiya would arrest citizens for roaming the streets from  to .

References 

Legal history of Poland
1981 establishments in Poland
Poland
Curfews